Psycho Surgery is the second studio album by the American Christian metal band Tourniquet. It was originally released on Intense Records and Metal Blade Records in 1991. A remastered version was released on Pathogenic Records in 2001 and includes revised artwork, an expanded album booklet, and bonus tracks that include live versions of songs featuring then-lead vocalist Luke Easter as well as demos. Retroactive Records released a remaster on June 26, 2020, retaining the original album title and including an extended booklet as well as different bonus tracks. Considered by critics to be Tourniquet's most balanced of the band's first three albums, Heaven's Metal fanzine ranked Psycho Surgery Christian metal's second-best album of all time (after Vengeance Rising's 1988 album Human Sacrifice). (Tourniquet retitled the 2001 re-release "Psychosurgery" as one word rather than two since co-founder and drummer Ted Kirkpatrick always felt that it should have been just one.)

Recording
Produced by Metal Blade Records' Bill Metoyer, Tourniquet recorded Psycho Surgery at Mixing Lab A & B studio in Garden Grove, California. Guitarist Erik Mendez and the bassist Victor Macias joined Tourniquet for this album, forming the quintet known as Tourniquet's classic line-up. After the release of Stop the Bleeding in 1990, the band caught Metal Blade Records' attention. Metal Blade Records released Psycho Surgery to the secular market, leaving the Christian market to original label Intense Records.

Psycho Surgery represented a more modern, experimental, and technical thrash-metal style, leaving behind the previous album's speed metal elements and incorporating classical music-influenced guitar riffs, complex tempo changes, and virtuosic guitar solos. One reviewer described the album as "Slayer plays Beethoven in a slightly rearranged way." Vocalist Guy Ritter also abandoned his King Diamond-like high-pitched falsetto in favor of a more melodic baritone register.

The album's crisp production creates a somewhat clinical and sterile atmosphere that serves to undergird the album's medical themes. Using his pharmaceutical background, drummer Ted Kirkpatrick infused the lyrics with medical terminology to serve as metaphors for particular social issues such as heretical sects ("A Dog's Breakfast") which also included a jab at three teachers in the Word of Faith Movement (Kenneth Copeland, Benny Hinn, and Kenneth Hagin), discrimination of the developmentally delayed ("Broken Chromosomes"), and parental neglect ("Dysfunctional Domicile"). The song "Stereotaxic Atrocities," a sequel to the previous album's "Ark of Suffering," features a brief reprise of the original's signature guitar riff and criticizes laboratory testing of animals. A re-recorded version of "Stereotaxic Atrocities" appeared on the album Onward to Freedom in 2014 and featured Marty Friedman of Megadeth on guitar and Luke Easter on vocals, with an instrumental version later appearing on Onward to Freedom: Voiceless in 2016.

Taking advantage of rap metal's new popularity, the album's popular song "Spineless" featured the vocal and sampling contributions of Christian hip-hop group Preachers in Disguise (P.I.D.). Although Kirkpatrick wrote most of the song's lyrics prior to entering the studio, P.I.D.'s Fred "Doug Tray" Lynch and Barry "G" Hogan crafted their own lyrical contributions on the spot. The fast-moving instrumental "Viento Borrascoso (Devastating Wind)" features Kirkpatrick's virtuosic drumming. The album's final song, "Officium Defunctorum," is a doom metal piece written by guitarist/vocalist Gary Lenaire that addresses Jesus Christ's crucifixion.

Reception

Metal Blade Records' wide distribution of Psycho Surgery increased Tourniquet's exposure and popularity. Following the album's release, the songs "Psycho Surgery," "Spineless," and "Viento Borrascoso" all achieved number-one positions on several charts, and readers of HM Magazine voted Psycho Surgery their "Favorite Album of the Year" in 1991. In 1992, Psycho Surgery also achieved two GMA Dove Award nominations in the categories Metal Album of the Year and Metal Recorded Song of the Year ("Psycho Surgery"). Critics consider the album a display of talented musicianship, intelligent lyrics, and originality. In August 2010, HM Magazine ranked Psycho Surgery #18 on its list of Top 100 Christian Rock Albums of All Time and the #2 album on its list of Top 100 Christian Metal Albums of All Time. In an interview with Noisecreep about the list, HM Magazine editor Doug Van Pelt explained that Psycho Surgery "found this band playing as a five-member band for the first time and they really bent creativity in metal in new directions that have still not been matched. Nobody has ever sounded like this band. I mean, Between the Buried and Me and maybe System of a Down are the closest in stretching creative boundaries. You almost had to pull out a medical dictionary to understand their [Tourniquet's] lyrics. Standout song would have to be the epic 'Broken Chromosomes,' which is a touching song about mistreated kids that are mentally handicapped. Chilling song."

Track listing

Credits

Original
Guy Ritter - Lead Vocals
Ted Kirkpatrick - Drums
Gary Lenaire - Lead Guitars, Rhythm Guitars, Lead Vocals
Erik Mendez - Lead Guitars, Rhythm Guitars
Victor Macias - Bass, Vocals

2000 Live Tracks
Ted Kirkpatrick - Drums
Luke Easter - Vocals
Aaron Guerra - Guitars, Vocals
Steve Andino - Bass

2000 Concert Intro
Aaron Guerra - Arrangement and Mix

References

External links
Psycho Surgery (1991) at Tourniquet.net
Psychosurgery (2001) at Tourniquet.net

Tourniquet (band) albums
1991 albums